The Papua New Guinea Hockey Federation is the governing body of field hockey in Papua New Guinea, Oceania. Its headquarters are in Boroko, NCD, Port Moresby. It is affiliated to IHF International Hockey Federation and OCF Oceania Hockey Federation.

Kaluwin Potuan is the President of Hockey Association of PNG and Thomas Kahai is the General Secretary.

History

Papua New Guinea at the 2015 Pacific Games#Field hockey

2016
PNG hosted the World League Qualifier for the Hockey World Cup in its capital city of Port Moresby in July 2016.

2017
PNG Hockey Federation announced its men’s and women’s squads for the Oceania Cup championships in Sydney, Australia, in October-2017.

See also
 Oceania Hockey Federation

References

External links
 PNG Hockey - FIH

National members of the Oceania Hockey Federation
Sport in Papua New Guinea